Charles John Tizeba (born 1 January 1961) is a Tanzanian CCM politician and Member of Parliament for Buchosa District constituency since 2010. He was the Deputy Minister of Transport. He was later appointed minister of agriculture.

On November 10, 2018, he was dismissed as Agriculture Minister on grounds of under-performance along with his counterpart Charles Mwijage, Minister for Trade and Investment.

References

1961 births
Living people
Chama Cha Mapinduzi MPs
Tanzanian MPs 2010–2015
Tanzanian MPs 2015–2020
Deputy government ministers of Tanzania
Mazengo Secondary School alumni
Tambaza Secondary School alumni
Peter the Great St. Petersburg Polytechnic University alumni